The Golden Globe Award for Best Supporting Actor – Series, Miniseries, or Television Film is a Golden Globe Award presented annually by the Hollywood Foreign Press Association (HFPA). It is given in honor of an actor who has delivered an outstanding performance in a supporting role on a television series, miniseries or motion picture made for television for the calendar year. The award was first presented at the 28th Golden Globe Awards on February 5, 1971, to James Brolin for his role on Marcus Welby, M.D.. It was presented under the title Best Supporting Actor – Television Series before changing to its current title in 1980. Starting with the 80th Golden Globe Awards, the category has been split into two categories: Comedy/Drama Series and Limited or Anthology Series or Television Film.

Since its inception, the award has been given to 52 actors. Paul Walter Hauser and Tyler James Williams are the current recipients of the award for their respective portrayals of Larry Hall on Black Bird and Gregory Eddie on Abbott Elementary. Ed Asner has won the most awards in this category, winning three times. Sean Hayes and Jeremy Piven have each been nominated for the award on six occasions, the most within the category.

Winners and nominees
Listed below are the winners of the award for each year, as well as the other nominees:

Best Supporting Actor – Television Series

1970s

Best Supporting Actor – Series, Miniseries or Television Film

1980s

1990s

2000s

2010s

2020s

Superlatives

Multiple wins

Multiple nominations

See also
 TCA Award for Individual Achievement in Drama
 TCA Award for Individual Achievement in Comedy
 Primetime Emmy Award for Outstanding Supporting Actor in a Drama Series
 Critics' Choice Television Award for Best Supporting Actor in a Drama Series
 Primetime Emmy Award for Outstanding Supporting Actor in a Comedy Series
 Critics' Choice Television Award for Best Supporting Actor in a Comedy Series
 Critics' Choice Television Award for Best Supporting Actor in a Movie/Miniseries
 Primetime Emmy Award for Outstanding Supporting Actor in a Limited Series or Movie
 Screen Actors Guild Award for Outstanding Performance by a Male Actor in a Drama Series
 Screen Actors Guild Award for Outstanding Performance by a Male Actor in a Comedy Series
 Screen Actors Guild Award for Outstanding Performance by a Male Actor in a Miniseries or Television Movie

References

Golden Globe Awards
 
Television awards for Best Supporting Actor